Bob Bryan and Mike Bryan were the defending champions, but Michaël Llodra and Nenad Zimonjić eliminated them in the semifinals.

Llodra and  Zimonjić won the tournament beating Robert Lindstedt and Horia Tecău in the final, 7–6(7–2), 7–6(7–4).

Seeds

Draw

Draw

References
 Main Draw

China Open - Doubles